Kalinowo  is a village in Ełk County, Warmian-Masurian Voivodeship, in northern Poland. It is the seat of the gmina (administrative district) called Gmina Kalinowo.

The village has a population of 750.

References

Villages in Ełk County